BINAP (2,2′-bis(diphenylphosphino)-1,1′-binaphthyl) is an organophosphorus compound.  This chiral diphosphine ligand is widely used in asymmetric synthesis.  It consists of a pair of 2-diphenylphosphinonaphthyl groups linked at the 1 and 1′ positions.  This C2-symmetric framework lacks a stereogenic atom, but has axial chirality due to restricted rotation (atropisomerism). The barrier to racemization is high due to steric hindrance, which limits rotation about the bond linking the naphthyl rings.  The dihedral angle between the naphthyl groups is approximately 90°.  The natural bite angle is 93°.

Use as ligand in asymmetric catalysis
BINAP is used in organic synthesis for enantioselective transformations catalyzed by its complexes of ruthenium, rhodium, and palladium. As pioneered by Ryōji Noyori and his co-workers, rhodium complexes of BINAP are useful for the synthesis of (–)-menthol.

Silver complexes are also important; BINAP-AgF can be used to enantioselectively protonate silyl enol ethers.

Subsequent studies revealed that related diphosphines with a narrower dihedral angle between the aromatic faces give catalysts that are more enantioselective. One such ligand is SEGPHOS.

Preparation
BINAP is prepared from BINOL via its bistriflate derivatives. Both the (R)- and (S)-enantiomers, as well as the racemate, are commercially available. One of the wide applications include chemoselective hydrogenation, where BINAP is conjugated to rhodium.

References 

Diphosphines